José Rosas Moreno (August 14, 1838 – July 13, 1883) was a Mexican writer of fables of the 19th century, son of Don Ignacio Rosas  and Doña Olaya Moreno.

Public office
He studied early on in León, Guanajuato before later entering the Colegio de San Gregorio in Mexico City. He always was a liberal thinker, ready to ask for ideas and opinions. After the restoration of the republic, he was at various times a deputy in General Congress. He was the person in charge of the foundation of various newspapers, as well as occupier of various public offices, like the Leon city hall register, deputy to the Legislature of Guanajuato, and later to the Congress of the Union.

Career
He was a poet of minor tone. His various lyrical works contain mildness and sweetness, nostalgia and gentle melancholy. He also wrote various plays for children, poems about the history of Mexico and children's reading books. A part of his poems was published in 1891 under the title "Ramo de violetas" with a prologue by Ignacio Altamirano." "La vuelta a la aldea" is one of his last romantics, showing the influence of the works of Bécquer in Mexican poetry. He also wrote lyric poetry, and helped to cultivate drama with an artistic feel.

He is commonly considered as the best Mexican fabulist and is known as the "Poet of Childhood", producing great poetic and dramatic works directed at children like "El Ratoncillo Ignorante." His fables are some of the best known in all of Mexico.

Works in wikisource

Poetry
 El Ratoncillo Ignorante
 El Zenzontle
 La vuelta a la aldea
 ¡Quién pudiera vivir siempre soñando!
 El Valle de Mi Infancia

See also
El Ratoncillo Ignorante

External links

Autor:José Rosas Moreno; wikisource (Spanish)

Mexican dramatists and playwrights
Mexican male poets
Mexican male writers
1838 births
1883 deaths
19th-century poets
19th-century Mexican dramatists and playwrights
Male dramatists and playwrights
19th-century male writers